Merchantville High School was a four-year public high school that operated from 1929 until 1972 in Merchantville, in Camden County, New Jersey, United States, operating as part of the Merchantville School District.

History
The school served students from the borough and the neighboring communities of Cherry Hill and Pennsauken Township, as well as Maple Shade in Burlington County.

Students from Pennsauken Township left the high school with the opening of Pennsauken High School in September 1959.

With the loss of Maple Shade students to the new Maple Shade High School in 1972, Merchantville closed its high school after the end of the 1971–72 school year and started sending its students to Pennsauken High School for grades nine through twelve.

Athletics
The boys' basketball team won the Group II state championship in 1947 vs. Weehawken High School and in 1965 vs. Clifford Scott High School. The 1965 team won the Group II title with a 57-54 win in the finals against Clifford Scott of East Orange at Atlantic City Convention Hall

Notable alumni
 George Dempsey (born 1929), former professional basketball player who played five seasons (1954–1959) in the National Basketball Association as a member of the Philadelphia Warriors and Syracuse Nationals.
 Bob Greacen (born 1947), former professional basketball player who played for the Milwaukee Bucks and New York Nets.
 Burrell Ives Humphreys (born 1927), former New Jersey Superior Court judge and county prosecutor who was the lead prosecutor in the second murder trial of Rubin Carter, which resulted in Carter's conviction in December 1976.
 Wyatt Tee Walker (1928–2018), executive director of the Southern Christian Leadership Conference and one of the founders of the Congress for Racial Equality, who is credited with planning the Birmingham campaign in 1963.
 George E. Williams, politician who served in the New Jersey General Assembly from the 7th Legislative District from 1994 to 1996.

References

1929 establishments in New Jersey
1972 disestablishments in New Jersey
Educational institutions disestablished in 1972
Educational institutions established in 1929
Public high schools in Camden County, New Jersey
Merchantville, New Jersey